Uktus Airport  is an airport in Russia located 20 km southeast of Yekaterinburg, on the site of the former Aramil military base. It is a small airfield 5 km south of the larger Koltsovo Airport.  Google Earth images shows dozens of general aviation prop planes and five helicopters.

Airlines and destinations

References

External links
  Official website

Airports built in the Soviet Union
Airports in Sverdlovsk Oblast
Buildings and structures in Yekaterinburg